Edmund H. Oliver  (1882–1935) was a Canadian Presbyterian and United Church of Canada minister, chaplain and educator. He played an integral role in the founding of St. Andrew's College, Saskatoon in 1912 – then known as the Presbyterian Theological College – and served as its first president. He was elected to the position of Moderator of the United Church of Canada by the 4th General Council at their meeting in London, Ontario in 1930.

Life
Born in Eberts, Kent County, Ontario in 1882, Oliver received his Bachelor of Arts from the University of Toronto in 1902. He went on to earn an M.A. the following year, before finally graduating with a Ph.D. in 1905. He moved to Saskatoon, Saskatchewan upon the request of Dr. Walter Murray and helped establish the University of Saskatchewan and, a few years later, the Presbyterian Theological College. Oliver returned to Toronto in 1910 to earn a Doctor of Divinity degree before returning to teach history at the newly founded University of Saskatchewan. He was appointed in 1913 by the Presbyterian General Assembly of Canada to serve as the first president of The Presbyterian Theological College. Oliver was deeply committed to the integration of theological education into the broader academic environment and post-secondary community. Under his leadership, the new college began plans to build and move into a new location right on the campus of the University of Saskatchewan.

At the outbreak of the First World War, Oliver enlisted as a military chaplain. Stationed mainly in France, he continued to be a proponent of education, establishing reading rooms for soldiers who were on leave and riding his bicycle out to the front lines in order to provide books and classes to the infantry. Oliver believed that this would allow those who survived to return to Canada and be leaders in their communities and society.

After the war, Oliver continued his work in theological education and became involved in the church union debates between the Presbyterian, Methodist and Congregational churches which would lead to the formation of the United Church of Canada in 1925. He was greatly influenced by the social gospel movement and served on two Royal Commissions: one to establish farming co-operatives and credit systems, and the other to create a liquor control board. He was named a fellow of the Royal Society of Canada in 1921.

Oliver saw his life work as one of service on the new frontiers of Canada, and during his time as Moderator of the United Church from 1930 to 1932, he lived into that, travelling across the country during The Great Depression urging people to donate clothing and food to those who needed it.

He died in 1935 at the age of 53, while working with youth at a summer camp.

References

Moderators of the United Church of Canada
1882 births
1935 deaths
Fellows of the Royal Society of Canada
People from Chatham-Kent
People from Saskatoon
Academic staff of the University of Saskatchewan
Members of the United Church of Canada
Ministers of the United Church of Canada
University of Toronto alumni
World War I chaplains